FreeFileSync is a free and open-source program used for file synchronization. It is available on Windows, Linux and macOS. The project is backed by donations. Donors get access to a Donation Edition that contains a few additional features such as an auto-updater, parallel sync, portable version, and silent installation. FreeFileSync has received positive reviews.

FreeFileSync works by comparing one or multiple folders on their content, date or file size and subsequently synchronizing the content according to user-defined settings. In addition to supporting local file systems and network shares, FreeFileSync is able to sync to Google Drive, FTP, FTPS, SFTP and MTP devices.

Adware/Malware 
Earlier versions were packaged with OpenCandy, an adware module which many antivirus software vendors classify as malware.

Since the release of version 10.0 in April 2018, the software is ad-free. In November 2018 Norton wrongly considered FreeFileSync installer as a malware and blocked its installation.

Supported OS 
FreeFileSync is available for 32bit and 64bit operating systems.
As of June 2021 the then current version 11.11 of FreeFileSync supported the following operating systems and versions:
 Windows 10 down to Windows 7.
 macOS 11.0 "Big Sur" down to Mac OS X 10.10 "Yosemite".
 On Linux many well-known distributions are supported. The website cites Arch Linux, CentOS, Debian, Fedora, Manjaro, Mint, openSUSE and Ubuntu.

Older operating systems 
Support for Windows Vista and XP ended with FreeFileSync_v10.11.
The latest release compatible with Mac OS X 10.7.5 is FreeFileSync_8.4_Mac_OS_X.
Older versions are still available on the project website.

See also 
 Comparison of file hosting services
 Comparison of file synchronization software
 Comparison of online backup services

References

External links
 Official website

Cross-platform free software
File copy utilities
Free file comparison tools
Software using the GPL license